vcpkg is a cross-platform open source package manager by Microsoft.

Overview
vcpkg provides access to C and C++ libraries to its supported platforms. The command-line utility is currently available on Windows, macOS and Linux.

vcpkg was first announced at CppCon 2016.

The vcpkg source code is licensed under MIT License and hosted on GitHub. 

vcpkg supports Visual Studio 2015 Update 3 and above.

See also

 List of software package management systems

References

External links

 
 

Command-line software
Free and open-source software
Free package management systems
Free software programmed in C++
Linux package management-related software
Microsoft free software
Software using the MIT license
Utilities for Linux
Utilities for macOS
Utilities for Windows
2016 software